Francesco Murgia (born August 9, 1990), known professionally as Chuck Warp, is an Italian electronic dance music producer, DJ, songwriter and pianist. Best known for the single Ho preso il fumo, best parody music of summer 2016 as voted by Rolling Stone Italia.

Discography

Singles 
 2016: Ho preso il fumo
 2017: Bordello
 2017: Keep the Beat
 2017: Zingaro

References 

Living people
1990 births
Italian dance musicians
Italian record producers